UFC 118: Edgar vs. Penn 2 was a mixed martial arts event held by the Ultimate Fighting Championship on August 28, 2010 at the TD Garden in Boston, Massachusetts, United States. The third UFC Fan Expo coincided with the event.  This event was the first the UFC held in Massachusetts.

Background
Nate Marquardt and Alessio Sakara were originally set to face each other at UFC 116, but the fight was cancelled due to the death of Sakara's father. On July 23, Sakara's original opponent, Jorge Rivera suffered a broken arm in training and was replaced by Gerald Harris. On August 5, Sakara (who was back on the card) then bowed out due to an unknown injury and was replaced by Joe Vedepo.  On August 18, it was announced that the Harris/Vedepo bout had been scrapped altogether.

A bout between Nate Marquardt and Rousimar Palhares was moved to UFC Fight Night 22 and promoted to the new main event. The original Fight Night main event was scheduled to be Demian Maia vs. Alan Belcher, however, Belcher had to withdraw due to an injured retina. As a result of this, Maia was moved to this card and fought Mario Miranda.

The event featured the first MMA appearance of a professional boxer with three-time world champion James Toney. The debut of a professional boxer took place at UFC 1 when Art Jimmerson lost to Royce Gracie by submission.

On August 5, it was announced that Terry Etim had suffered a broken rib in training and was pulling out of his bout with Joe Lauzon. Etim was replaced by former UFC and TUF veteran Gabe Ruediger. 

Phil Baroni was scheduled to face John Salter, but Baroni was forced off the card on July 27 with a collarbone injury. Dan Miller served as Baroni's replacement.

On August 25, Dana White announced that the winner of the Florian vs. Maynard fight would be guaranteed the next shot at the lightweight title.

Results

Bonus awards
Fighters were awarded $60,000 bonuses.

Fight of the Night: Nate Diaz vs. Marcus Davis
Knockout of the Night: Not awarded as no matches ended by knockout.
Submission of the Night: Joe Lauzon

Reported payout
The following is the reported payout to the fighters as reported to the Massachusetts State Athletic Commission. It does not include sponsor money or "locker room" bonuses often given by the UFC and also do not include the UFC's traditional "fight night" bonuses.

Frankie Edgar $96,000 (includes $48,000 win bonus) def. B.J. Penn $150,000
Randy Couture $250,000 (no win bonus) def. James Toney $500,000
Demian Maia $68,000 ($34,000 win bonus) def. Mario Miranda $8,000
Gray Maynard $46,000 ($23,000 win bonus) def. Kenny Florian $65,000
Nate Diaz $60,000 ($30,000 win bonus) def. Marcus Davis $31,000
Joe Lauzon $24,000 ($12,000 win bonus) def. Gabe Ruediger $8,000
Nik Lentz $22,000 ($11,000 win bonus) def. Andre Winner $10,000
Dan Miller $30,000 ($15,000 win bonus) def. John Salter $8,000
Greg Soto $12,000 ($6,000 win bonus) def. Nick Osipczak $10,000
Mike Pierce $24,000 ($12,000 win bonus) def. Amilcar Alves $6,000

References

See also
 Ultimate Fighting Championship
 List of UFC champions
 List of UFC events
 2010 in UFC

Events in Boston
Ultimate Fighting Championship events
2010 in Boston
2010 in mixed martial arts
2010 in sports in Massachusetts
August 2010 sports events in the United States
Mixed martial arts in Massachusetts
Sports competitions in Boston